The Pasta de Conchos mine disaster occurred at approximately 2:30 a.m. CST on February 19, 2006, after a methane explosion within a coal mine near Nueva Rosita, San Juan de Sabinas municipality, in the Mexican state of Coahuila. The mines were run by Grupo México, the largest mining company in the country.  It was estimated that 65 miners, who were working the 10 p.m. to 6 a.m. shift that morning, were trapped underground by the explosion. Only 2 of the 65 bodies have been recovered.

Background
There have been conflicting reports regarding the depth at which the miners were trapped. Guadalupe Rosales Martínez, the sister of a worker saved from the mine opening, told the Los Angeles Times that the workers had previously complained about a gas leak in the mine. Norma Vitela, the wife of a mine worker trapped inside the mine, told The Miami Herald that her husband complained about the same leak.

Explosion
When the gas explosion occurred, the temperature inside the mine increased to 1,110 degrees, releasing methane and carbon monoxide that would have absorbed nearly all available oxygen.

Rescue efforts
By February 21, 2006 Grupo México search teams and relatives of the trapped miners were beginning to lose hope. Each miner was allotted an oxygen pack, but the pack only guaranteed the miners six hours of oxygen. The Governor of Coahuila, Humberto Moreira Valdés, told the Televisa television network that the mine's ventilation service, which uses fans to import oxygen and export dangerous gases, was still in operation. However, the February 21 edition of The Miami Herald remarked, "Even so, they could not be certain the precious oxygen was arriving to where the miners were trapped." Rescue crews managed to get through a wall of debris before encountering another  wall inside the tunnel, where it was believed at least two conveyor belt operators may have been trapped just behind.

It was reported that mine workers had gone on strike against Grupo México at least 14 times, "not only for salary increases… but because of its constant refusal to review security and health measures." Grupo México said that they, in conjunction with the mining union, signed a certificate on February 7, 2006 declaring the mine safe.

On February 23, 2006 Grupo México advanced to a part of the mine shaft where they believed two of the 65 workers were trapped. However, they found nobody, leading them to believe the force of the explosion knocked them through the mine shaft deeper than they had anticipated. The next day, Grupo México advanced approximately halfway into the 1.75-mile long mine, where an additional twenty-four miners were expected to have been found. Again, nobody was found, and Grupo México hypothesized that either the miners were buried under debris or the miners were located in a deeper part of the mine. On the evening of February 24, Grupo México announced that search efforts were to be suspended for two or three days, due to the search teams advancing to a portion of the mine which leaked out high levels of natural gas. On the afternoon of February 25 the CEO of Grupo México confirmed during a press conference that "there was no possibility of survival after the methane explosion", based on a scientific report. The following day the Secretary of Labor, Francisco Javier Salazar Sáenz, and Governor Moreira announced the mine would be closed indefinitely once all the bodies were recovered.

The Diario newspaper of Ciudad Juárez published a report from Mexican officials and the U.S. Mine Safety and Health Administration, stating that due to the high levels of gas in the mine, it would be very rare, if not impossible, to have any survivors from the rescue efforts.

Aftermath
After the rescue of 33 trapped miners in October 2010 in Copiapó, Chile, bishop Raúl Vera demanded that the case be reopened.

According to the IndustriALL Global Union, as of August 2016, "Ten years after the mining homicide at Pasta de Conchos, Mexico, the government has still not conducted a thorough investigation into the real causes of the disaster, brought those responsible to justice, recovered the bodies or compensated the families of the victims."

Recovery operation
On February 18, 2020, the Mexican government announced it would resume the search for 63 bodies still lost in the accident. Grupo México insisted they voluntarily returned the concession to the government. Families of the victims say the company did not conduct a thorough search because they did not want the deplorable working conditions revealed; company officials insist it is too dangerous to carry out the rescue operation. In 2018 the Inter-American Commission on Human Rights agreed with the families. President Lopez Obrador promised in 2019 that he would recover the bodies.

The government and family members reached an agreement on September 14, 2020. The bodies of the miners would be rescued, a memorial will be built, and the 65 families will be compensated by the end of the year. The estimated US$75 million cost will be financed by the CFE through sale of the coal from the mine. President Andrés Manuel López Obrador (AMLO) announced on February 19, 2021, the 15th anniversary of the accident, that rescue efforts had begun. He expressed hope that the rescue effort would be completed by the end of his term in office.

References 

2006 mining disasters
Coal mining disasters in Mexico
History of Coahuila
2006 in Mexico
Political scandals in Mexico
February 2006 events in North America
2006 disasters in Mexico